Dacryoadenitis is inflammation of the lacrimal glands.

Symptoms 

 Swelling of the outer portion of the upper lid, with possible redness and tenderness
 Pain in the area of swelling
 Excess tearing or discharge
 Swelling of lymph nodes in front of the ear

Complications

Swelling may be severe enough to put pressure on the eye and distort vision. Some patients first thought to have dacryoadenitis may turn out to have a malignancy of the lacrimal gland.

Causes 
Acute dacryoadenitis is most commonly due to viral or bacterial infection. Common causes include mumps, Epstein-Barr virus, staphylococcus, and gonococcus.

Chronic dacryoadenitis is usually due to noninfectious inflammatory disorders. Examples include sarcoidosis, thyroid eye disease, and orbital pseudotumor.

Diagnosis
Dacryoadenitis can be diagnosed by examination of the eyes and lids. Special tests such as a CT scan may be required to search for the cause. Sometimes biopsy will be needed to be sure that a tumor of the lacrimal gland is not present.

Prevention

Mumps can be prevented by immunization. Gonococcus, bacteria can be avoided by the use of condoms. Most other causes cannot be prevented.

Treatment

If the cause of dacryoadenitis is a viral condition such as mumps, simple rest and warm compresses may be all that is needed. For other causes, the treatment is specific to the causative disease.

Prognosis

Most patients will fully recover from dacryoadenitis. For conditions with more serious causes, such as sarcoidosis, the prognosis is that of the underlying condition.

References

External links 

 Source (NIH/Medline)
 eMedicine
 

Inflammations
Disorders of eyelid, lacrimal system and orbit